is a railway station in the town of  Misato, Miyagi Prefecture, Japan, operated by East Japan Railway Company (JR East).

Lines
Rikuzen-Yachi Station is served by the Rikuu East Line, and is located 6.6 rail kilometers from the terminus of the line at Kogota Station.

Station layout
The station has one side platform, serving a single bi-directional track. The station is unattended.

History
Rikuzen-Yachi Station opened on 13 April 1960. The station was absorbed into the JR East network upon the privatization of JNR on 1 April 1987.

Surrounding area

See also
 List of Railway Stations in Japan

External links

  

Railway stations in Miyagi Prefecture
Rikuu East Line
Railway stations in Japan opened in 1960
Misato, Miyagi
Stations of East Japan Railway Company